This page lists the results of leadership elections held by the Alberta New Democratic Party. The position of party leader was not officially created until the 1963 convention. From the Alberta NDP's formation in 1962 until 1963 the party president was Neil Reimer who served as de facto leader.

1963 leadership convention

(Held on January 27, 1963)

Neil Reimer elected
Ivor Dent

(Note: the vote totals do not appear to have been released. The race was said to be close.)

Former Alberta CCF leader Floyd Albin Johnson and high school teacher William McLean were also candidates but withdrew before balloting.

1968 leadership convention

(Held on November 10, 1968)

Grant Notley 143
G.S.D. Wright 113
Alan Bush 22

Notley was killed in a plane crash on October 19, 1984. Ray Martin was chosen interim leader.

1984 leadership convention

(Held on November 10, 1984)

Ray Martin acclaimed

1994 leadership convention

(Held on February 5, 1994)

Ross Harvey 230
Bruce Hinkley 69
Laurence Johnson 58
Clancy Teslenko 54

1995 leadership challenge

(Held on November 11, 1995)

Ross Harvey 177
Anne McGrath 118
Joe Weykowich 30
Lawrence Dubrofsky 3

1996 leadership convention

(Held on September 8, 1996)

Pam Barrett 257
Mimi Williams 52
Joe Weykowich 49
Archie Baldwin 0

Barrett resigned on February 2, 2000. Raj Pannu was chosen interim leader.

2000 leadership convention

(Held on November 5, 2000)

Raj Pannu acclaimed

Pannu resigned on July 13, 2004. Brian Mason was chosen interim leader.

2004 leadership convention

(Held on September 18, 2004)

Brian Mason acclaimed

2014 leadership convention

(Held in Edmonton October 18 to 19, 2014)

Rachel Notley  70%
 David Eggen 28%
 Rod Loyola  2%
3,589 votes were cast.

On April 29, 2014, Brian Mason announced that he will step down as leader as soon as a leadership election can be held to choose his successor.

References

Carty, Kenneth R et al. Leaders and Parties in Canadian Politics: Experiences of the Provinces. Harcourt Brace Jovanovich Canada, 1992.
Stewart, David K. and  Archer,Keith  A Quasi-democracy? Parties and leadership selection in Alberta. UBC Press, 2000.

See also
leadership convention
Alberta New Democratic Party

 
New Democratic Party provincial leadership elections